A referendum on ending apartheid was held in South Africa on 17 March 1992. The referendum was limited to white South African voters, who were asked whether or not they supported the negotiated reforms begun by State President F. W. de Klerk two years earlier, in which he proposed to end the apartheid system that had been implemented since 1948. The result of the election was a large victory for the "yes" side, which ultimately resulted in apartheid being lifted. Universal suffrage was introduced two years later.

Background

On 2 February 1990, in his opening address to parliament, State President F. W. de Klerk announced that the ban on certain political parties such as the African National Congress and the South African Communist Party would be lifted and that Nelson Mandela would be released after 27 years in prison. De Klerk announced that capital punishment would be suspended and that the state of emergency would be lifted. The State President said in his speech to parliament that "the time to negotiate has arrived".

Nelson Mandela was released on 11 February 1990 from Victor Verster Prison in Paarl near Cape Town. On 21 March 1990, South West Africa became independent under the name of Namibia. In May the government began talks with the ANC. In June the state of emergency was lifted and the ANC had agreed to a ceasefire. In 1991, the Acts which restricted land ownership, specified separate living areas and classified people by race were abolished.

Before the referendum
Prior to the referendum, the governing National Party had lost three by-elections since announcing negotiations to end apartheid two years earlier, and its position was opposed by the Conservative Party which opposed the negotiations and boycotted the Convention for a Democratic South Africa (CODESA). On 24 January 1992, President de Klerk opened parliament and suggested that a referendum would be held, in which the vote of each race group would be counted separately. When the National Party was defeated in the Potchefstroom by-election on 19 February, after calling it a test vote, its credibility was placed in doubt.

In the meantime, negotiations between the government and the African National Congress were making slow progress. Violence was increasing in the South African townships, different right wing groups were becoming more prominent, and there was growing dissatisfaction within the white community. Conditions and the mood in the black townships was worsening as well. The government was thus under domestic and international pressure to make progress in the negotiations.

While the Conservative Party claimed that the government did not have the mandate to negotiate with the ANC after its defeat in Potchefstroom, State President F. W. de Klerk announced 20 February, that a national referendum for the white electorate would be held to test the government's—and his own—support: if the referendum's outcome had been negative, de Klerk would have resigned and general elections held. When de Klerk initially announced the referendum, many were critical of the fact that only whites had the right to vote in the referendum.

Campaign
The National Party and Democratic Party campaigned for a "Yes" vote, while the conservative right wing led by the Conservative Party campaigned for a "No" vote. Much of de Klerk's efforts in 1992 were directed toward appeasing and weakening his right-wing opponents, the conservative defenders of apartheid who had broken away from the National Party during the 1980s. De Klerk attempted to show white South Africans that the government was not giving up power to the ANC, but negotiating on the basis of "power sharing". It warned the white voters that a "No" vote would mean continuation of international sanctions, the danger of civil war and worsening chaos in South Africa.

De Klerk told the press that he would interpret a majority "Yes" vote as a mandate to enter into binding agreements with the ANC and other black leaders, without further approval from white voters. He stated that a second referendum to approve the terms of the constitutional settlement would not be necessary unless they differed "substantially" from the government's promises. These promises included a bill of rights, separation of powers between the branches of government, an independent judiciary, and a Parliament consisting of two houses.

The National Party "Yes" vote campaign was of a kind that had never before been seen in South Africa. The National Party held large political gatherings through the country and published advertisements in many national newspapers and bought commercial time in television. It produced massive election "Yes" posters with the message "Yes! Ja! SA" and a poster showing a picture of an AWB member with a gun and with the text "You can stop this man! Vote YES". The Democratic Party had more traditional posters with the message "Ja vir vrede (Yes for peace)".

The "No" campaign, led by Andries Treurnicht warned of "black majority rule", "ANC communist rule", "increase in crime", "increased murders of farmers and pensioners", "increased poverty", "increased unemployment" and "lowering of standards". The Conservative Party also advocated white self-determination and argued that white South Africans had the right to rule themselves. During the campaign, the "No" side also started to advocate an independent homeland, or volkstaat, for the white minority. 

The "Yes" campaign had a significant advantage, as it was backed by the government, the opposition Democratic Party, the media, the international community and the vast majority of commercial and business organisations. According to the Center for Strategic and International Studies:

Results

By region
In Cape Town (a left-wing stronghold) and Durban 85% voted "yes" and in Pretoria over 57% voted "yes". Only Pietersburg in the Northern Transvaal, a rural right-wing stronghold, voted "no" with 57%. Even in Kroonstad, a conservative stronghold where five out of the seven parliamentary seats were held by "no" campaigners, the "yes" side won with 52%.

Aftermath
The day after the referendum President de Klerk said "Today we have closed the book on apartheid" as he celebrated his 56th birthday. Nelson Mandela said that he was "very happy indeed". The Cape Times news bill was dominated by the large text "IT'S YES".

The alliance between the Conservative Party and the Afrikaner Weerstandsbeweging may have harmed the CP and in some cases even scared away voters to the "Yes" side. Some conservative and militant defenders of apartheid boycotted the referendum, although turnout was at record levels, reaching above 96% in some areas.

De Klerk and his government could now claim that the whites were in favour of universal suffrage and that they had a clear mandate to negotiate with the African National Congress. The ANC had initially disapproved the referendum, mainly because whites were the only ones allowed to vote. But since a "No" vote would not only risk the negotiations but also increase the political chaos in the country, and since it had no reason to advocate that whites oppose the negotiations, the ANC advocated a "Yes" vote.

Right-wing groups criticised the referendum and accused the government of electoral fraud. They had lost where they had previously been the strongest, in the Afrikaner heartland and in the big cities. However, no evidence has ever been put forward regarding electoral irregularities. Treurnicht claimed that media propaganda, foreign intervention, threats by businesspeople against employees, and electoral fraud had resulted in a "Yes" vote.

On 27 April 1994, South Africa held its first non-racial elections, which resulted in a huge victory for the African National Congress and made Nelson Mandela the first black President of South Africa.

See also

 Convention for a Democratic South Africa

Bibliography
 Nelson Mandela, Long Walk to Freedom: The Autobiography of Nelson Mandela; Little Brown & Co;  (paperback, 1995)

References

20th century in South Africa
1992
1992 referendums
Events associated with apartheid
1992 in South Africa
March 1992 events in Africa